The 2007 UK & Ireland Greyhound Racing Year was the 82nd year of greyhound racing in the United Kingdom and Ireland.

Summary
Two time English Greyhound Derby champion Westmead Hawk was aimed towards a third Derby attempt after recovering from injury over the winter. His trainer Nick Savva and owner Bob Morton sent him to Monmore for two races on 3 and 10 May and then Wimbledon on 19 and 26 May. After finishing second in the Derby Trial Stake on 26 May his connections decided not to go for a third Derby and retired him to stud.

The 2007 English Greyhound Derby progressed without Westmead Hawk and was won by his kennelmate Westmead Lord. The Irish equivalent went to Tyrur Rhino for trainer Paul Hennessy who recorded a 1-2 when Tyrur Laurel finished runner-up.

Charlie Lister won his fourth trainers title.

Tracks
Brough Park underwent a re-branding by their owners William Hill Bookmakers and would now be known as Newcastle. This was possible due to the fact that it was the only greyhound track remaining in Newcastle; White City, Gateshead and Gosforth had all previously existed in the city. Sister track Sunderland was the recipient of a significant prize money increase as plans were announced that a new festival would be held. It included the William Hill Classic offering a £40,000 winner's prize and the William Hill Grand Prix for £25,000.

Dundalk unveiled the all-weather horse track to go alongside the new greyhound track costing a further €24 million. The total improvements had cost €35million. 
Three independent tracks closed, Wisbech, Bedwellty and Hinckley, the latter was sold to developers.

Competitions
Charlie Lister won the Trainers championship at Hall Green and then trained Fear Haribo to the Scottish Greyhound Derby title at Shawfield, in a track record time.

Mahers Boy trained by Elaine Parker claimed the first ever William Hill Classic and Go Edie Honda picked up the Grand Prix title. Spiridon Louis took the St Leger crown and would go on to be voted Greyhound of the Year after also winning the Regency, the TV Trophy and setting track records at Yarmouth and Walthamstow. Top Honcho won the Irish Greyhound Review Stud Dog of the Year Award for a record sixth time.

News
At an NGRC enquiry, Belle Vue veterinary surgeon Paul Evans was found guilty of supplying incorrect season suppressants which led to a feud between the Royal Veterinary College and the NGRC.

Wimbledon trainer Ray Peacock died after a car accident, the Keston based Peacock aged 52 had been taken to East Surrey Hospital in Redhill but had been pronounced dead on arrival. Walthamstow trainer Gary Baggs relinquished his licence to concentrate on his battle against cancer and switched his licence to daughter Stacey. Top open race trainer Terry Dartnall handed his licence to his son Matt and Wimbledon Racing Manager Derek Hope left to join William Hill and was replaced by Gary Matthews.

Roll of honour

Principal UK finals

+ Track record

	

+ Track record

Principal Irish finals

References 

Greyhound racing in the United Kingdom
Greyhound racing in the Republic of Ireland
2007 in British sport
2007 in Irish sport